WHGM (1330 AM) is a radio station broadcasting an Oldies/Classic Hits format. Licensed to Havre De Grace, Maryland, United States, its daylight signal covers from the Eastern Baltimore area, including Towson and Bel Air to Elkton and Newark. The station is owned by Steve Clendenin, through licensee Maryland Media One, LLC.

The station began broadcasting on May 15, 1948, owned by Jason & Virginia Pate of Havre de Grace. After WWII, Mr. Pate applied for the first radio license in Havre de Grace. The station later began broadcasting on FM as WHDG which in the late 1980s, was sold to Delmarva Broadcasting.

The station broadcasts with an omni-directional signal 24- hours-a-day. Studios are in the Arts & Entertainment district of Havre De Grace at 331 North Union Avenue.

Long-time Baltimore television personality Royal Parker began his broadcasting career on the station in the 1940s, when it was WASA, hosting a music program called the Royal Record Review.

On June 6, 2016, WHGM changed its format to adult hits, branded as "Smash Hits WHGM", it also broadcasts on FM translators W263CQ 100.5 FM Chesapeake City, Maryland; W284BE 104.7 FM Havre de Grace, Maryland; and W298CG 107.5 FM Bel Air, Maryland.

In late 2018 or early 2019, WHGM dropped the "Smash Hits" branding and rebranded as "WHGM Gold" and changed its format from adult hits to an Oldies/Classic hits format playing music from the '60s, '70s and '80s.

Translators

Previous Logos
 (Previous Logo under SMASH Hits branding)

References

External links

Havre de Grace, Maryland
HGM
Radio stations established in 1948
1948 establishments in Maryland
Oldies radio stations in the United States